Carlos Iván Velásquez (born August 4, 1984, in Cataño, Puerto Rico) is a Puerto Rican former boxer best known for winning the featherweight title at the 20.Central American and Caribbean Games 2006 in Cartagena. He is the twin brother of Juan Carlos Velasquez.

Amateur career
Velásquez participated in the 2004 Olympics at the age of 20 at featherweight but lost his first match to Edvaldo Oliveira of Brazil, by decision (43-43;countback). He qualified for the Olympic Games by ending up in second place at the 1st AIBA American 2004 Olympic Qualifying Tournament in Tijuana, Mexico.

At the 2006 Central American and Caribbean Games, he defeated Marlon Almagro (Venezuela), upset Olympic champion Yuriorkis Gamboa 10:7 in the semifinals and won Gold against Ronald de la Rosa (Dominican Republic).

Professional career
Velásquez turned pro for promoter Luis de Cubas and Shelly Finkel and won his first 12 fights.

On September 14, 2008, he (9-0, 8 KOs) knocked out Jose Navarrete (12-18-2, 5 KOs) at 1:11 of the fifth round of the eighth-rounder.

On September 29, 2015, Velasquez fought Javier Fortuna for Fortuna's WBA's world Super Featherweight title in Las Vegas, Nevada. In what has ultimately turned out to be his last fight, Velasquez lost by tenth-round technical knockout.

Velasquez retired from professional boxing with 19 wins and 2 defeats in 21 contests, 12 wins and both losses being by knockout.

References

External links
Central American games

1984 births
Living people
People from Cataño, Puerto Rico
Featherweight boxers
Boxers at the 2003 Pan American Games
Olympic boxers of Puerto Rico
Boxers at the 2004 Summer Olympics
Puerto Rican male boxers
Central American and Caribbean Games gold medalists for Puerto Rico
Competitors at the 2006 Central American and Caribbean Games
Central American and Caribbean Games medalists in boxing
Pan American Games competitors for Puerto Rico
21st-century Puerto Rican people